MotoGP 09/10 is a racing video game, part of the MotoGP series. It is available on Xbox 360 and PlayStation 3.

Gameplay

Career mode
MotoGP 09/10 features 4 modes with the first of them being Career Mode. Players take control of their career on and off of the track competing in races and hiring engineers, team managers and press officers to help further their career as a pro and ultimately win the MotoGP World Championship. Demonstrating their riding skills on the track through overtaking, slip-streaming and showboating will be rewarded with Rider Reputation points. Pushing too hard can be detrimental as collisions and crashes will reduce the reputation bonus at the end of each race. The more rider reputation points players earn, the more attractive they become to other manufacturers, sponsors, and employees. The player's team will also research upgrades for an existing bike to increase its performance. As players start off at the 125cc they can upgrade their team into the 250cc/Moto2 series and then ultimately into the MotoGP series. Career Mode has a limitless number of years allowing players to continue career mode indefinitely.

Championship mode
Players can race in 125cc, 250cc/Moto2 and MotoGP championships from the 2009 and 2010 seasons as it unfolds. The realistic AI will emulate true racing pack with different riding styles and pace making this a challenging mode for all GP fans.

Arcade
Players must show off their skill to stay in the race as they compete to finish a whole season in 125, 250/Moto2 or MotoGP class before running out of time. Each lap, clean section, overtake and top speed reached will reward players with more time but crashing off the track or getting overtaken will cause time to be deducted from the player's total and the chances of living the MotoGP dream will be over.

Online
Compete against other riders across the globe, in online multiplayer mode.  There can be up to 20 bikes in a race.

Soundtrack
The game has a soundtrack featuring contemporary break-beat, dub-step and drum-and-bass producers, and also rock artists (provided by Platinum Sound Publishing):
Torche: Healer
Freeland: Best Fish Tacos in Ensenada
Freeland: Under Control
Subsource: The Ides
Eighties B-Line: Love Turns to Hate
Plump DJ's: Rocket Soul
White Lies: Death (Chase and Status Remix)
Home Video: Confession (of a Time Traveller)
Boom Boom Satellites: Kick it Out
Boom Boom Satellites: Morning After
State of Mind: Sunking
Vacation: Make Up Your Mind
Curve: Want More Need Less
Evil Nine: Twist the Knife (feat Emily Breeze)

Release

Demo
A demo was announced to be released on the Xbox Live Marketplace about 1 month before release which would give it a release of February. The demo consists of a stripped down Championship Mode which is limited to the 125cc class and the Mugello Circuit. It also contains the 600cc Moto2 Arcade Mode and the 800cc MotoGP Time Trial mode. The demo was released on March 4, 2010 on the Xbox 360 and PS3.

Downloadable content
Capcom announced two free DLC packs to be released sometime after the game's release. The first pack contains the 800cc bike class with all of the bikes, riders and team liveries, as well as the brand new track for the 2010 MotoGP season, the new Silverstone Arena Circuit. The second pack includes all of the bikes, riders and team livery updates for the Moto2 and 125cc bike classes, giving players brand new MotoGP 2010 data far earlier than ever before.

Reception

The game received "average" reviews on both platforms according to the review aggregation website Metacritic.

References

External links

2010 video games
Capcom games
Grand Prix motorcycle racing video games
PlayStation 3 games
Racing video games
Video games developed in the United Kingdom
Xbox 360 games
Grand Prix motorcycle racing
Video games set in Australia
Video games set in California
Video games set in the Czech Republic
Video games set in England
Video games set in France
Video games set in Germany
Video games set in Indianapolis
Video games set in Italy
Video games set in Japan
Video games set in Malaysia
Video games set in the Netherlands
Video games set in Qatar
Video games set in Spain
Video games set in Portugal